IL Gneist is a sports club from Ytrebygda, Bergen, Norway founded on December 16, 1945. It has several branches, including association football, handball, athletics, gymnastics, orienteering, climbing and volleyball.

The main seat is in Liland, not far from Flesland International Airport.

The men's football team plays in the Norwegian Fourth Division, the women's team in the Third Division.

The men's handball team plays in the Norwegian Third Division, the women's team in the First Division.

External links
 Official site

Football clubs in Norway
Sport in Bergen
Sports clubs established in 1945
Athletics clubs in Norway
1945 establishments in Norway